Carmenta corni, the aster borer moth, is a moth of the family Sesiidae. It was described by Henry Edwards in 1881. It is known in North America, including Wisconsin.

Adults are on wing from July to August.

The larvae feed on the roots of Veronica and Aster species and Eurybia macrophylla.

References

External links
Moth Photographers Group. Mississippi State University.

Sesiidae
Moths described in 1881